Scyrotis namakarooensis is a species of moth of the  family Cecidosidae. It is found in Namibia.

References

Endemic fauna of Namibia
Cecidosidae
Insects of Namibia
Moths of Africa